The Political Commissar of the People's Liberation Army Navy is the political head of the People's Liberation Army Navy (PLAN). 

The Commissar is in charge of building Party organizations and directing political ideology, as well as building the force. The political commissar holds a unique position in the PLAN.

List of Political Commissars

References

Further reading
 
 
 

People's Liberation Army Navy